Sociology of Revolution is a 1925 book by Russian American sociologist Pitirim Sorokin. Sociology of revolution as branch of sociology was developed by Thomas Hobbes in Leviathan. to a certain extent earlier than Sorokin. Hobbes lived and created in the period of English Revolution. In the opinion by Hobbes, "the war of all against all" (Bellum omnium contra omnes) begins in the period of revolution and of Civil War, when all men threaten by each man, when each man has the right to all things by right of strong man, when "Man Is Wolf to Man" (Homo homini lupus) Sorokin had generalized the data about the new revolutions, unknowns for Hobbes – French Revolution, Russian Revolution (1917), etc.

Review
Wilbur Cortez Abbott wrote in work "The Working of Revolution". that Sorokin has worked, so to speak, in a laboratory of revolution. Sorokin was, indeed, not able to set down his conclusions in Bolshevist Russia; Sorokin was banished from Russia in 1922, Sorokin wrote his book in the more hospitable atmosphere of Czecho-Slovakia". Sorokin was head of the department of sociology in the University of Petrograd, he was one of the leaders of the moderate revolutionary party, he was a member of the All-Russian Peasants' Soviet and of the Constituent assembly " in 1917-1918. Sorokin had been imprisoned three times, condemned to death and finally exiled by Bolshevist government for that. What is the result of his study of Russian revolution? Book of Sorokin is, briefly, the most damning indictment of Bolshevist regime. This book is a careful study of revolution in general. It is one of the best descriptions of revolution ever written—that of Thucydides on Corcyra—as it is with the events in France of the eighteenth century or Russia in the twentieth. Revolution is reversion of civilized people to savagery.

History of creation
The book Sociology of revolution was conceived by Sorokin in the years of Russian Civil War in 1917–1922. Sorokin started writing of this book in Prague in 1922. This book was published in the US in 1925.

Sorokin was entitled the privatdozent of Petrograd university in January, 1917 . Sorokin became the editor of the newspaper of Socialist Revolutionary Party and the personal secretary of the prime minister Alexander Kerensky after February Revolution. Sorokin was arrested by Bolsheviks as the deputy of the Russian Constituent Assembly on January 2, 1918, Sorokin was compelled to disappear from the authorities after release from bolshevist prison. Then Sorokin had published the open letter in newspaper in which Sorokin states a failure of tactics of Socialist Revolutionary Party and Sorokin declares a gap with this party. Vladimir Lenin focused the attention on this letter in the Lenin's known article "Valuable Recognitions of Pitirim Sorokin". Sorokin stopped being engaged in political activity and Sorokin resumed own teaching activity. The authorities didn't like its devastating Sorokin's review about work of Nikolai Bukharin "The theory of a historical materialism". Later the set of the Sorokin's book "Hunger as a factor in Human Affairs" was destroyed. Sorokin was arrested as the representative of "bourgeois professorate" and forced out from Russia under the threat of execution in 1922. Sorokin appeared in the US for this reason.

Is revolution good or bad?

The theory of revolution was developed in Marxism too. Lenin's theory about the reasons for revolution, about the revolutionary situation resembles the Sorokin' theory partly, but theories of Lenin and Sorokin differ each other in the estimation of the value of this phenomenon as revolution sharply. Lenin considered that revolution is good; revolutions are "the festivals of the oppressed and the exploited". Revolution is only method for such revolutionaries as Marx, Engels and Lenin to receive the authority without the elections, since the capitalist dictatorship would not allow a communist party to win in democractic elections. Marx named the revolutions as "the locomotives of history". Sorokin and Hobbes considered that revolution is very bad. Sorokin considered that the revolution is the severe social illness, which can lead to death of social organism suddenly, that revolution is the worse method of an improvement of the life of masses. The revolutionaries promise to masses "gold mountains" in the words, but masses receive the hunger, the epidemics and the executions of innocent people in reality. The negligible results of revolution are reached by enormous price.

Sorokin proposes other methods of improvement and reconstruction of the social organization:
 The peaceful reforms, which don't jam the base instincts of man.
 Scientific research must precede to practical experiment.
 It need conduct the experiment on a low social scale at first.
 Reforms must be carried out by lawful and constitutional means

The conclusion: These canons are observed even under the erection of bridges and breeding of cattle. The inhabitant of distant planet, who observed the cataclysms of Russian revolution, could conclude that the cows and bridges are valued more expensively on the Earth than human life.

The reasons of revolution
For the comparison it is possible to give Lenin's opinion about the reasons for revolutionary situation:

Sorokin named two reasons for the revolution:
 the suppression of base instincts at the majority of population.
 the disorganization of authority and social control.

Why does the suppression of base instincts lead to the revolution always? Because it forces man to search the exit from the desperate condition. The hunger weakens the brakes, which retain by man from the theft, eating of low-quality food from the dustbin, robbery and murder.
The law-abiding citizen becomes thief and bandit because of the hunger, worker becomes beggar, the believer ceases to be fasted and aristocrat goes to the market to sell the trousers. The complete disappearance of brakes in the behavior of people can lead to the disintegration of the society, when man tears away "the framework" of civilized behavior completely and this man convert into the beast, which it is permitted all (the murder, violence, robbery).

The kinds of the suppressed instincts as the first reason for the revolution

 The hunger, as the suppression of digestive instinct. Hunger preceded all revolutions, especially the hunger on the background of aristocratic gluttony on the feasts.
 The increase of poverty, as the suppression of the impulse of property. The proletariat was poor as "church rat" in Russia. History piled the proletariat to "the bed from the nails". The revolutionary armies were comprised most frequently from the poor layers, which can not to lose something, but which can acquire all.
 Losing wars and state terror, as the suppression of the instinct of self-preservation. Unsuccessful wars precede revolutions. Lost wars converts soldiers returning home into a potent force for social unrest, as with Russian soldiers in 1917 and with German soldiers in 1918. Soldiers may turn on the government, since the defeat in the war exposes social issues. For example, the Commune of Paris came after the Franco-Prussian War, the Jacquerie in France during the Hundred's Year War, the uprising of Wat Tyler in England after the Hundred's Year War, the 1905 Russian Revolution after the Russo-Japanese War, the 1917 February Revolution in Russia at the end of World War I. In a sense, regimes that practice state terrorism are "pregnant" with revolution and more liable to quickly destabilize. 
 The censorship and the prohibition of the human migration, as the suppression of the impulse to have of freedom of press and freedom of movement.
 The limitations of estates of the realm, as the suppression of the instinct of self-expression. The limitations of estates of the realm prevented by people from the bottoms from engaging of high socioeconomic status, which corresponds to their talents; therefore the innate ruler, who became simple workers, will become by the leader of secret organization, "Cicero" will become by propagandists.

These are the authentic reasons for revolution, and excuse can be completely different (the quarrel around the religious dogmas or convocation of General States). Ideology determines the selection of the slogans ("holy earth", "true faith", "republic" or "socialism"). Ideology determines the selection of popular heroes—Jesus Christ, Jan Hus, Jean-Jacques Rousseau, Martin Luther, Karl Marx, Leo Tolstoy or Karl Liebknecht. Ideology determines the selection of basic idea (interpretation of gospel, national idea, the theory of surplus value or capitalist exploitation). Ideology determines the selection of emblem ("red Phrygian cap" is the identification mark of French revolutionary—Jacobins, "black shirt" is form of the Italian fascists of Benito Mussolini, "pentagonal red star" is sign of membership in the Red Army).
What social groups do become revolutionary at first of all and why?
Those estates and social groups will be most revolutionary, which have the largest quantity of jammed instincts and, on the contrary, this estates and social groups will be enemies of revolution, which have not jammed instincts completely or which have a small quantity of jammed instincts. Therefore, Bolsheviks could keep on soldiers and workers by the revolutionary ideas easy, and aristocrats were against the revolution always. There were 95% of population on the side of the revolution in February 1917 in Russia, and then some social groups started opposing revolution escalation, these groups wanted that the government brought an order. Even peasants and sailors had risen against the Bolsheviks in Kronstadt In 1921. Soviet government had held the authority under these conditions only cause of the terrible fatigue from the cataclysms of Civil War and cause of concessions in the form of the New Economic Policy.

The disorganization of authority and social control as the second reason for revolution
The disorganization of authority and social control means the incapacity of government to crush the rebellion, to remove the conditions, which cause the dissatisfaction of population, to cleave the mass on the part and to set them against each other by the principle "divide and rule", to direct the way out of energy for masses into another no-revolutionary "river's bed" according to the principle "to open the valve so that the boiler would not explode". The atmosphere of pre-revolutionary epochs amazes by observer with weakness of the authorities and with degeneration of the elite always. Chronicler Ipuwer wrote about the weakness of authority of pharaohs on the eve of the Egyptian revolution of the epoch of average kingdom: "There is no ruler in the country. But where is ruler? Had ruler fallen asleep? Ruler had lost the force and ruler is not support to us". The same situation was in Russia in 1917. There was not one sane and imperious minister, decrepit Ivan Goremykin, incompetent Boris Stürmer, mad Alexander Protopopov and mad Vasily Virubov is the entire gallery of mediocre rulers and cynical dwarfs, this is the result of the complete degeneration of elite. History "suffers" cruel and injurious governments until they are able to operate the state, but history will carry severe verdict to powerless and parasitic governments. The degeneration of elite becomes inevitable, when elite converts into the caste, when social "lifts" are switched off and way is closed for the innate rulers to upward with help of artificial barriers on the way of circulation into the members of elite. Talented premier-minister Sergei Witte was undergone dislike in side of Nicholas II of Russia repeatedly. When revolutionary explosion occurs, then pitiless revolutionary broom clears out entire social rubbish (aristocrats—degenerates). "Upstarts" from the bottoms rush to upward on the social ladder through the enormous slot in the social sieve of selection. This sieve exists on each floor of social ladder during the normal period of existence of society, when there is no revolution in society. Therefore, new elite builds the new "sieve" at the second stage of revolution, under protection of which the upstarts, who reached the social top, merge with the remainders of the old aristocracy, which are left for transfer of experience of control over people. New Bolshevik "sieve" passed to upward only those, who were "from the machine tool" or "from the wooden plough", and new Bolshevik "sieve" rejected to downward all rest people.

The second stage of revolution
Revolution has two stages. There is a mad energy output at the first stage of revolution, but the person is not the Perpetuum mobile therefore mass apathy and fatigue comes sooner or later. The vigorous group or the tyrant can seize power at the second stage of revolution easily, using this weakness and they can restore an old regime. The second stage is a stage of "reaction" or "restraint". Reasons generating this stage, are strengthening of hunger, crime, requisitions, epidemics, "wars of all against all". People face a dilemma: or to be lost, continuing revolutionary uproar, or to bring an order at any cost. Examples "creators of an order" are Vladimir Lenin, Maximilien de Robespierre, John Zizka, Oliver Cromwell, Augustus, Napoleon, who are able to bring an order "an iron fist" after the period of revolutions or reforms. Society which isn't capable to develop with help of peace reforms, is compelled to pay a tribute for revolution at a rate of considerable part of the population. It is possible to draw a conclusion that peace reform is much better, than a social revolution.

See also
 Social conflict
 Social revolution

Major works
 Sorokin P. A. Sociology of Revolution. Philadelphia, 1925.
 Russian edition of this work - Сорокин П. А. Человек. Цивилизация. Общество..—Политиздат, 1992.—543 с. "Социология революции".

References

External links

 Питирим Александрович Сорокин "Социология революции"
 http://www.prognosis.ru/lib/P_Sorokin.pdf
 The sociology of revolution. By Pitirim A. Sorokin. Philadelphia: J. B. Lippincott Co. 1925. Reviewed by Wilbur Cortez Abbott Harvard University 
 http://64.62.200.70/PERIODICAL/PDF/SaturdayRev-1925apr11/6-7/
 Владимир Ленин "Ценные признания Питирима Сорокина"
 http://libelli.ru/works/37-11.htm
 Ломоносова М. В. Социология революции Питирима Сорокина // Вестник СПбГУ. Социология. 2017. Т. 1. Вып. 3. С. 251-268.
 https://www.elibrary.ru/item.asp?id=30525498

1925 non-fiction books
Books about the Russian Revolution
Conflict (process)
History books about revolutions
Oliver Cromwell
Works about warfare
Censorship
Works about human migration
Sociology books
English Revolution
ru:Социология революции